Xinbin Manchu Autonomous County (Mölendroff: sinbin manju beye dasangga siyan), or simply Xinbin County (postal: Sinpin), is one of the three counties under the administration of the prefecture-level city of Fushun, in the east of Liaoning Province, China, bordering Jilin Province to the east.

The county is home to Hetu Ala, the first capital of the Later Jin and the Yong Mausoleum (清永陵) of the Later Jin and the Qing dynasty.

Administrative divisions
There are nine towns, one ethnic town and 10 townships in the county.

Climate

References

External links

Xinbin Manchu Autonomous County
County-level divisions of Liaoning
Manchu autonomous counties